Tarrafal is a concelho (municipality) of Cape Verde. It is situated in the northern part of the island of Santiago. Its seat is the town Tarrafal. Its population was 18,565 at the 2010 census, and its area is 120.8 km2.

Subdivisions
The municipality consists of one freguesia (civil parish), Santo Amaro Abade. The freguesia is subdivided into the following settlements (population data from the 2010 census):

Achada Biscanhos (pop: 310)
Achada Lagoa (pop: 64)
Achada Longueira (pop: 520)
Achada Meio (pop: 211)
Achada Moirão (pop: 587)
Achada Tenda (pop: 1,242, town)
Biscainhos (pop: 695)
Chão Bom (pop: 5,166)
Curral Velho (pop: 358)
Fazenda (pop: 107)
Figueira Muita (pop: 160)
Lagoa (pop: 55)
Mato Brasil (pop: 160)
Mato Mendes (pop: 194)
Milho Branco (pop: 165)
Ponta Lobrão (pop: 435)
Ribeira da Prata (pop: 1,009, town)
Tarrafal (pop: 6,656, city)
Trás os Montes (pop: 464)

History
The municipality was created in 1917, when two northern parishes of the older Municipality of Santa Catarina were split off to become the Municipality of Tarrafal. In 1997, the southeastern part of the municipality was split off to become the Municipality of São Miguel. Under Salazar the Tarrafal Concentration Camp was built on the plain south of town (Chão Bom) to contain opponents of the political regime.

Demography

Politics
At the federal level, it belongs to the constituency of Santiago North. Since 2004, the Movement for Democracy (MpD) is the ruling party of the municipality. The results of the latest elections, in 2016:

Notable people

Pany Varela, futsal player
Pedro Celestino Silva Soares, footballer (soccer player)
Silvino Lopes Évora, writer
Mário Lúcio de Sousa, singer, member of the band Simentera
Janício Martins, footballer (soccer player)

International relations

Tarrafal is twinned with the following municipalities in Portugal:
Amadora
Fundão
Grândola
Marinha Grande
Moita
Montijo

References

External links
 Câmara Municipal do Tarrafal
 ANMCV (Associação Nacional dos Municípios Cabo-Verdianos - National Association of the Capeverdean Municipalities)

 
Municipalities of Cape Verde
Geography of Santiago, Cape Verde